Alexey Anatolyevich Volkov (born 5 April 1988) is a Russian former biathlete.

Career
He competed at the Biathlon World Championships 2012 in Ruhpolding, and at the Biathlon World Championships 2013 in Nove Mesto na Morave. He competed at the 2014 Winter Olympics in Sochi, in the individual and in the Men's relay. Together with Anton Shipulin, Evgeny Ustyugov and Dmitry Malyshko he won the gold medal in the Men's Relay.

Biathlon results
All results are sourced from the International Biathlon Union.

Olympic Games
1 medal (1 gold)

World Championships
1 medal (1 gold)

*During Olympic seasons competitions are only held for those events not included in the Olympic program.
**The mixed relay was added as an event in 2005.

Biathlon World Cup

World Cup rankings

Overall record

Podiums

References

External links
International Biathlon Union – Alexey Volkov
 

1988 births
Living people
Biathletes at the 2014 Winter Olympics
Russian male biathletes
Olympic biathletes of Russia
Biathlon World Championships medalists
Competitors stripped of Winter Olympics medals
People from Khanty-Mansi Autonomous Okrug
Sportspeople from Khanty-Mansi Autonomous Okrug
20th-century Russian people
21st-century Russian people